Forever More or Forevermore may refer to:

Music
Forever More (band), a Scottish progressive rock band
Forevermore (band), an American Christian metalcore band
Forever More (album), a 2008 album by Tesla
Forevermore (Whitesnake album), 2011
Forevermore (Juris album), 2011
Forevermore (David Archuleta album), 2012
Forevermore (Destine album), the last album by Destine released in 2015
Forevermore, an album by Isole
"Forever More" (Moloko song), a 2003 song by Moloko
"Forever More" (Puff Johnson song)
"Forevermore" (Yuna song), from Rouge
"Forevermore", a 2014 song by Ike Moriz
"Forevermore", a song by Epica featuring Ruurd Woltring
"Forevermore", a song by Side A
"Forevermore", a song by Dream Evil from Evilized
"Forevermore", a song by Shadows Fall from Threads of Life
"Forevermore", a song by Thunderstone from Evolution 4.0
"Forevermore", a song by Xandria from Neverworld's End

Other uses
Forevermore (film), a 2002 Philippine film starring Kristine Hermosa
Forevermore (TV series), a 2014 Philippine TV series starring Enrique Gil and Liza Soberano